Home is a 2012 album by Irish singer-songwriter Chris de Burgh. The album features acoustic re-recordings of 14 lesser-known songs from de Burgh's back catalogue. It was recorded during June 2012 in de Burgh's home studio in Enniskerry in County Wicklow, Ireland.

Track listing 
All songs written by Chris de Burgh.
"Waiting for the Hurricane" – 2:59
"Tender Hands" – 3:59
"Fatal Hesitation" – 3:30
"Love & Time" – 4:10
"Sailor" – 4:03
"Living on the Island" – 2:51
"It's Such a Long Way Home" – 3:04
"Where We Will Be Going" – 4:19
"Forevermore" – 3:20
"Fire on the Water" – 3:03
"Suddenly Love" – 3:12
"I Will" – 3:10
"I'm Not Scared Anymore" – 3:43
"Goodnight" – 2:18
"Last Night" (Limited Edition only) – 4:38
"Carry On" (Limited Edition only) – 4:17

"Last Night" and "Carry On" are included as bonus tracks on a limited edition version of the album released in Germany.

An "Amazon Exclusive" version of the album available for streaming or download includes "Last Night" as a bonus track.

Personnel 
Credits adapted from album liner notes.
 Chris de Burgh – vocals, acoustic piano, guitar
 Nigel Hopkins – keyboards, accordion, string arrangements
 Phil Palmer – guitar
 Neil Taylor – guitar
 David Levy – bass guitar
 Tony Kiley – percussion
 Steve Sidwell – trumpet
 Chris Porter – backing vocals

Production 
 Chris de Burgh – producer, sleeve design 
 Chris Porter – producer, engineer, mixing 
 Alex Hutchinson – art direction 
 Sarah Fulford – art direction, sleeve design, photography 
 Kenny Thomson – sleeve design, photography, management

Weekly charts

References 

2012 albums
Chris de Burgh albums